In old pharmacy, a cucupha or cucufa was a cap, or cover for the head, with cephalic spices quilted in it, worn for certain nervous distempers, particularly those affecting the head.

References

History of pharmacy